Mohammad Shakeel Ahmed (born November 12, 1971, Daska, Punjab) is a Pakistani former cricketer who played in three Tests and two One Day International matches between 1993 and 1995. He is currently based in Johannesburg, South Africa.

He left Pakistan and settled in Johannesburg, South Africa where he played for Easterns cricket team in 1998-99 winter, becoming the first Pakistani to play in South African domestic cricket.

He was a wicketkeeper-batsman.

References

1971 births
Living people
Pakistan Test cricketers
Pakistan One Day International cricketers
Habib Bank Limited cricketers
Bahawalpur cricketers
People from Sialkot District
Pakistani cricketers
Rawalpindi B cricketers
Islamabad cricketers
Gujranwala cricketers
Peshawar cricketers
Easterns cricketers
Pakistani emigrants to South Africa